Aurail is a scrolling shoot 'em up arcade game developed by Westone and released by Sega in 1990. The player pilots a tank mecha and shoots enemies (it can fire in 8 directions), collects power-ups to increase shields, operates the remote attack drone, and defeats bosses to advance levels. It features tunnel levels with a first-person view.

In North America, the game was released as an arcade conversion kit.

Gameplay
Gameplay is divided into two types. Some stages let the player take control of the tank from a top-down 3rd-person view. The tank can shoot in 8 directions. Holding down the fire button enables auto-fire, but the tank is not able to move during that time. The tank is destroyed with one hit, but a certain amount of energy can be used to create a shield, which can take one hit. Up to three shields can be stacked. Energy is obtained by collecting power orbs which are left by shot down enemies. Enemies can also leave a green "D"-power up, which summons a robotic orb which will accompany the tank until the next life loss. As long as energy is available, the orb can be ordered to attack a target in range. The other stages are played from a first-person view. The player must fend off several waves of enemies and navigate through destructible mines. In this mode, the tank can also move while auto-firing. Power orbs can again be obtained, but the robotic orb is not present in this mode. The button to make the orb attack is instead used to turn the tank around.

Relation to Blood Gear
Westone's PC Engine/TurboGrafx-16 game Blood Gear (1994) identifies itself as "Aurail Scenario 2" in the ending credits. However, Westone co-founder Ryuichi Nishizawa has stated in an interview, that Blood Gear is not a sequel.

References

External links
Aurail at Arcade History
Aurail at GameFAQs

Aurail at Hardcoregaming101.net

1990 video games
Arcade video games
Arcade-only video games
Cooperative video games
First-person shooters
Multiplayer and single-player video games
Scrolling shooters
Sega arcade games
Video games about mecha
Video games developed in Japan
Westone Bit Entertainment games